Jessie Louisa Whitman (1863-1957) was the niece of the renowned American writer, Walt Whitman. Her interview with Ralph L. Fansler, coupled with her letters, have greatly contributed to Walt Whitman's biographical information.

Early life 
Whitman was born in 1863 to Martha Mitchell Whitman and Walt Whitman's brother, Thomas Jefferson "Jeff" Whitman in Brooklyn, New York. She had one sister, Manahatta "Hattie" Whitman. The family moved to St. Louis in 1868 but remained close to Walt and their other family members on the east coast. In the early 1870s and 1880s, Jessie and Hattie went East for school and spent many summers living with George Whitman in Camden, New Jersey. Walt Whitman was living in the house of George Whitman during this time.

One of Jessie's earliest recorded memories of her uncle Walt was from her summers spent at George Whitman's house in Camden. She recalls that Lou, George's wife, would often make Walt's favorite meals. Upon seeing the prepared meal, Walt would leave the house without a word. Angered, Lou would turn to Jessie and say, “geniuses are not especially easy to live with.” Jessie also remembers, albeit inaccurately, Walt Whitman's meeting with Oscar Wilde. These memories were recorded by Ralph L. Fansler, who initially interviewed Jessie under the pseudonym Garrett Newkirk. He later revealed his true identity, and the two maintained correspondence throughout most of Jessie's late life.

Later life 
Around 1945, Jessie's lawyer and a friend had her committed to a sanitarium. As evinced from her letters to Fansler, however, it seems that her mental health was stable despite having been committed. She was released from the sanitarium to spend the last several years of her life with Rudolph Blome, who was her nurse and companion beginning in the late 1940s. She died in Roswell, New Mexico in 1957. Her body was returned to St. Louis, where she was buried alongside her mother, father, and sister.

References 

1863 births
1957 deaths
People from Brooklyn